Raja Muhammad Safdar Khan is a Pakistani politician who had been a member of the National Assembly of Pakistan from 2008 to 2013.

He is brother of Raja Muhammad Asad Khan.

Political career
He ran for the seat of the National Assembly of Pakistan from Constituency NA-62 (Jhelum-I) as a candidate of Pakistan Muslim League (N) (PML-N) in 2002 Pakistani general election but was unsuccessful. He received 51,618 votes and lost the seat to Chaudhry Shahbaz Hussain, a candidate of Pakistan Muslim League (Q) (PML-Q).

He was elected to the National Assembly from Constituency NA-62 (Jhelum-I) as a candidate of PML-N in 2008 Pakistani general election. He received 92,479 votes and defeated Chaudhary Shahbaz Hussain, a candidate of PML-Q.

In 2013, he quit PML-N and joined Pakistan Peoples Party (PPP).

References

Living people
Pakistani MNAs 2008–2013
People from Jhelum District
Pakistan Muslim League (N) MNAs
Year of birth missing (living people)

Politicians from Jhelum